Plesiopiuka is a monotypic genus of Brazilian jumping spiders containing the single species, Plesiopiuka simplex. It was first described by G. R. S. Ruiz in 2010, and is only found in Brazil.

References

Monotypic Salticidae genera
Salticidae
Spiders of Brazil